2010 oil spill may refer to:

 Barataria Bay oil spill, near Bayou St. Dennis, 26 July 2010 
 Kalamazoo River oil spill, Calhoun County, Michigan, 26 July 2010
 Deepwater Horizon oil spill in the Gulf of Mexico, 20 April 2010
 2010 Great Barrier Reef oil spill off Australia, 3 April 2010
 2010 Port Arthur oil spill in Texas, started 23 January 2010
 Yellow River oil spill in China, started on 30 December 2009 and continued in 2010
 Jebel al-Zayt oil spill in the Egyptian Red Sea, 15 June 2010
 Xingang Port oil spill in the Yellow Sea, July 16 2010
 2010 Mumbai oil spill off the coast of Mumbai started on August 7, 2010

See also
List of oil spills